Carnival Air Lines Incorporated was a charter and scheduled airline division of the Carnival Corporation & plc that started in 1988 after Carnival Cruise Lines purchased Pacific Interstate Airlines. It was headquartered in Dania Beach, Florida.

History
The origins of Carnival Air Lines can be traced to 1984 when Pacific Interstate Airlines was founded in Las Vegas, Nevada.  This airline flew charters between Las Vegas and Los Angeles with a single Boeing 727-100 jetliner. In 1985, the name was changed to Pacific Inter Air and then two years later the name was changed to Bahamas ExPress. By this time the airline was flying out of airports in the East Coast of the US to Freeport in the Bahamas. Carnival Cruise Lines bought the company in 1988 and the airline's name was once again changed to Fun Air, but its aircraft was never painted with that name and cruise ship passengers were flown under the name Majestic Air.

The final identity of Carnival Air Lines came to being in 1989 and began flying from Miami, the Northeast USA and later on expanded to other destinations, with its home base in Ft. Lauderdale, Florida. (See routes below).

In 1992, Carnival Air Lines began a code-share agreement with Iberia of Spain to transport connecting passengers from Madrid to Los Angeles via Carnival's Miami Hub. The route was originally operated by a Boeing 737-400 but was replaced in 1994 with Carnival's first Airbus A300B4. In 1993, Carnival began operating its first wide-body aircraft by flying Lan Chile's Boeing 767 as part of the interchange agreement with the Chilean airline. The exclusive route was from Miami to New York's JFK airport. In 1995, when the agreement with LAN-Chile was not renewed, another agreement was formed with Ladeco of Chile to transport connecting passengers from Santiago to New York via Carnival's Miami Hub flying a Carnival Airbus A300 in LADECO's livery.

In September 1997, Pan Am Corporation, a holding company formed by the reincarnated Pan American Airways, bought Carnival Air Lines in an attempt to bolster its fleet and operations into a new airline based on the old Pan Am. Before the airlines could fully merge, the holding company and its two independently operated airlines, Pan Am and Carnival, filed for bankruptcy protection and ceased scheduled flight operations in February 1998. The air operator's certificate used for the reincarnated Pan Am was abandoned in favor of the acquired Carnival operating certificate. Pan Am, now operating with the Carnival certificate, quickly resumed limited charter operations while new owner Guilford Transportation Industries of Massachusetts acquired certain assets of the bankrupt companies after court approval. The new company emerged from bankruptcy in June 1998 and discontinued the use of the Carnival brand name for the Pan Am name and logo instead. Guilford ceased operating Pan Am and relinquished its original Carnival airworthiness certificate on November 1, 2004.

Destinations in 1993

The airline was operating jet service to the following destinations at this time:

 Aguadilla (BQN)
 Fort Lauderdale (FLL)
 Grand Turk (GDT)
 Islip (ISP)
 Los Angeles (LAX) 
 Miami (MIA)
 Nassau (NAS)
 Newark (EWR)
 New York City (JFK)
 Ponce (PSE)
 Providenciales (PLS)
 San Juan (SJU)
 Tampa (TPA)
 West Palm Beach (PBI)
 White Plains (HPN)
 Worcester (ORH)

Routes in 1995

By November 1995, Carnival Air Lines flew to the following destinations:

From the Northeast to Florida and the Caribbean:
Hartford, CT; Newburgh, NY; Islip, NY; White Plains, NY; New York, NY; Newark, NJ
From Florida to the Northeast, Caribbean and Los Angeles:
West Palm Beach; Fort Lauderdale, Miami, Fort Myers, Tampa, Orlando
From Los Angeles to Miami and Ft. Lauderdale
From the Caribbean to Florida and the Northeast:
Nassau, Bahamas; San Juan, Ponce and Aguadilla, Puerto Rico; Port-au-Prince, Haiti; Punta Cana, Dominican Republic

Destinations in 1996

According to the Carnival Air Lines December 19, 1996 route map, the air carrier was serving the following destinations with mainline jet aircraft:

 Aguadilla, Puerto Rico-Aguadilla (BQN)
 Fort Lauderdale, FL- Fort Lauderdale (FLL)
 Fort Myers, FL- Southwest Florida International Airport (RSW)
 Hartford, CT- Bradley International Airport (BDL) - seasonal service
 Islip, NY - Long Island MacArthur Airport (ISP)
 Los Angeles- Los Angeles International Airport (LAX)
 Miami, FL- Miami International Airport (MIA)
 Newark, NJ - Newark International Airport (EWR)
 Newburgh, NY-Stewart International Airport (SWF) - seasonal service
 New York City, NY - John F. Kennedy Airport (JFK)
 New York City, NY - LaGuardia Airport (LGA)
 Orlando, FL - Orlando International Airport (MCO)
 Ponce, Puerto Rico - Ponce (PSE)
 San Juan, Puerto Rico -San Juan (SJU)
 Tampa, FL - Tampa International Airport (TPA)
 Washington, D.C. - Dulles International Airport (IAD)
 West Palm Beach, FL - West Palm Beach (PBI)

The above referenced route map also depicts code sharing service flown by Paradise Island Airlines with de Havilland Canada Dash 7 turboprop aircraft and operated in conjunction with Carnival Air Lines to the following destinations:

 Fort Lauderdale, FL (FLL)
 Fort Myers, FL (RSW)
 Key West, FL (EYW)
 Paradise Island, Bahamas (PID)
 West Palm Beach, FL (PBI)

Fleet

This is an extract found regarding the Carnival Air Lines fleet:

Carnival Air Lines route structure mainly served the northeast U.S., Florida, Los Angeles and the Caribbean.

See also
 List of defunct airlines of the United States
 Pan American Airways (1996-1998)

References

External links

Carnival Fleet
Carnival Air Lines route map
Carnival-Ladeco agreement

Airlines established in 1988
Airlines disestablished in 1998
Carnival Corporation & plc
Defunct airlines of the United States
Pan Am
Airlines based in Florida
Defunct companies based in Florida
Companies based in Broward County, Florida
Carnival Cruise Lines